Strauss Group Ltd. , formerly known as Strauss-Elite, is among the largest food products manufacturers in Israel. Strauss Group focuses on dairy products, coffee, water, snacks, salads, and dips. Its subsidiary Strauss Coffee is a leading coffee company in Eastern Europe and Brazil.

The Group has 15,000 employees worldwide, is active in more than 20 countries. Strauss has collaborations with Danone, PepsiCo, Haier and Virgin.

History

1918–1933: Candy business in Russia and Latvia 
Eliyahu Fromenchenko (also spelled Fromchenko), a Russian Jew, with his family launched a candy business in 1918, after preparing confections in his home kitchen. Fleeing the economic and political chaos that followed the rise of Communism in the Soviet Union, he moved to Latvia and in 1924, merged into Laima in Riga. In 1933, he sold his stakes in Laima and moved to Mandatory Palestine.

1933–2004: Elite 
Fromenchenko immigrated in 1933 to Palestine, bought property in Ramat Gan and opened Elite. Production began in the spring of 1934, with the first product reaching the stores in time for Passover. The most popular brand was Shokolad Para (cow chocolate), whose name came from the image of the cow on the packaging. As the company grew, factories were opened in Safed and Nazareth Illit. In 1958, Elite launched Israel's first coffee company. Its major competition both for chocolates and coffee was Lieber, which it bought out in March 1970. In 1982, Elite launched its popular "Pesek Zman" line of chocolate bars.

The Israeli snack-food market had been traditionally divided by Elite in the sweets market and Osem in the savoury market. In 1991, Elite decided to expand by entering the salty snack market by establishing a new factory in Sderot and specifically producing "Shush", a copy of the Bamba snack, the most popular snack in Israel made by Osem. Elite became the local licensee of Frito-Lay products, producing the best-selling brand "Tapuchips". Later, Elite started selling coffee outside of Israel, especially in Europe and South America. The initiative, "Café 3 Corações", did not reach its objectives, but it signaled Elite's start as an international company.

Elite was labeled a monopoly by the Israel Antitrust Authority, in the markets of instant coffee, black coffee and chocolate fields, and blamed for abusing its monopoly position. In 2006, Elite–Strauss paid a fine of 5 million NIS, without admission of guilt.

1936–2004: Strauss 
Richard and Hilde Strauss, German Jews from Nieder-Olm, immigrated in 1936 to Nahariya in the British Mandate of Palestine and started a dairy farm initially with two cows. Excess production that Richard could not sell was made into cheese by Hilde and soon cheese became the main focus of the business. Dessert products followed. In the 1950s, Strauss added ice-cream products, with about 50 employees in their Nahariya factory.

In 1969, after Groupe Danone purchased a part of the company's ownership, Strauss expanded from ice-cream manufacture and to puddings and other individual packaged dairy desserts, most popular of which was "Dani" and, about 15 years later, "Milky". In 1975, Michael Strauss, son of the founders, became the CEO of the company.

In 1995, the company went into the prepared-salads business. The Strauss hummus brand, "Achla", became very popular in Israel. In 1997, the company purchased 50% of the ownership of the Yotvata dairy. In the same year, Strauss purchased Elite and grew to over 7,000 employees and a US$1 billion/year turnover, although the formal merger between the companies did not occur until 2004.

In 2001, Ofra Strauss, Michael's daughter, became the CEO of the company. In the same year, it acquired the Max Brenner chain of chocolate cafés with locations across Asia, Australia and the United States.

Strauss was cited by the Israel Antitrust Authority as a monopoly in 2004, a status that essentially places the company under government regulation limiting the way it can change the price of its products to protect the consumer and smaller competitors.

2004–2007: Strauss–Elite 
Strauss and Elite merged in 2004 to become Strauss–Elite, which, in 2005, acquired control of New York-based Sabra food producing company, to operate as a joint-venture with Frito-Lay, a division of PepsiCo.

In December 2005, Strauss–Elite merged its coffee activity with Santa Clara Indústria e Comércio de Alimentos Ltda in Brazil. The merged company, Santa Clara Participações, is the second largest coffee manufacturer in Brazil.

Since 2007: Strauss Group 
In 2007, the company's name reverted to Strauss with a new corporate logo.

Strauss Ice Cream was removed from the Strauss Group portfolio and became private with 51% of the company owned by Unilever, and 49% owned by the Strauss family. Strauss ice creams are marketed under Unilever's Heartbrand in Israel and North America.

The Strauss Group has sold the Max Brenner brand in 2017 to some of the franchisees.

Strauss family timeline

Strauss Dairy and General Milestones 
1936 – Hilde and Dr. Richard Strauss leave Nazi Germany and arrive with their two-year-old son Peter-Michael to the Jaffa port of the British Mandate Palestine.
1937 – Residing in Nahariya, they buy two cows and plant vegetables and crops to start their family business.
1939 – They sell the already 20-cow cowshed and buys Dairy in Nahariya. Milk was provided by the neighboring kibbutzim (farming collectives).
1955–1958 – Michael Strauss studies milk technology in Weizmann Institute, Switzerland, and Milkana in Ulm, Germany.
1959 – Due to financial difficulties, Israeli Finance Minister Sapir approves a loan.
1960 – Michael imports Gervais cheese to Israel.
1962 – He signs a know-how and royalties agreement with Gervais, the leading French fresh-cheese producer.
196 – Gervais merges with Danone to become Gervais Danone. Michael wins three awards in the Israel food exhibition for the Camembert cheese, smoked cheese and ice cream
1968 – Strauss wins the tastiest product award
1969 – Partners with Danone, which purchases 28% of Strauss shares. The partnership continues until 1980 when Danone dismantles it due to Arab League boycott of Israel.
1972 – Strauss builds a new factory in Nahariya and starts production of "Dani".
1979 – It markets "Milky".
1983 – Michael receives the Israel Prize for Industry.
Mid 1980s – Strauss purchases Golan dairies.
1987 – Michael is appointed the head of the food division in the Israel Manufacturers Association.
1995–1998 – Strategic partnerships are made with Uniliver 1995, Danone 1997 and PepsiCo Frito-Lay 1998 and purchases 15% of Elite shares, 50% of Yotvata dairies, and coffee factories in Bulgaria, Croatia, Turkey.
1998–2000 – Acquisitions are assimilated. 
2000 – A new dairy opens in Ahihud to become the most advanced and biggest dairy in the Middle East.
2001 – Strauss appoints Ofra Strauss as the CEO, succeeding her father Michael.
2001–2003 – Strauss purchases Max Brener, has a marketing agreement with Lavazza, partners with Yad Mordechay and purchases the Salats company.
2004 – Strauss and Elite become one company.                                                                                         Strauss becomes publicly traded on the stock market. 
2005 – It purchases Sabra Salads Company and enters the North America market and also purchases MK Café company in Poland, merging with Santa Clara coffee of Brazil.  
2006 – It launches Sabra in the United States and purchases Carousels via Sabra.
2008 – It partners with PepsiCo for developing and selling dips and spreads in the American market.
2010 – It inaugurates a salads factory in Virginia, the largest salads factory worldwide. Tari extends activities to Western Europe, Serbia, Brazil, Mexico and Australia 
2013 – It becomes one company – Sabra-Obela.
2016 – It purchases German coffee factory NDKW Norddeutsche Kaffeewerke GmbH.
2017 – It re-purchases TPG shares in Strauss Café.

Strauss Ice Cream 
 1940 – Hilde Strauss experiments with ice cream recipes and develops the Strauss recipe, one that would later become the company's iconic product. Her husband Richard Strauss purchases a milk-pasteurization machine.                                                                                           Raya Strauss is born.
1945 – Hilde Strauss's ice cream is introduced in a food exhibition in Tel Aviv.
1949 – Strauss ice cream is introduced to the marketplace. 
1962 – Strauss leases an ice-cream factory in Acre for the production of the Exodus and Tilon ice-cream brands.
1968 – Strauss ice cream wins the best-ice-cream award.
1978 – Strauss becomes the leading Israeli ice-cream manufacturer. 
1979 – Strauss purchases Witman Ice Cream.
1991 – Strauss establishes the Blue Moon Ice Cream parlors.
1995 – In July, a fire breaks out in the factory.
1995 – In September, Unilever purchases 50% of the ice-cream company.
1996 – The entity merges into Strauss Icecream Ltd.
2014 – Unilever becomes the full owner of Strauss Icecream Ltd.

Strauss Salads 
1990 – Strauss purchases Mi Va Mi Salads.
1991 – It launching “Achla” label salads. 
1992 – It purchase Italian Chibby Salads.
1995 – It founds the Maadaney Olam salads company
1998 – PepsiCo Frito-Lay purchases 50% of Elite Mazon, a salty-snacks Elite Company.
1999 – Strauss strategically partners with PepsiCo.
2003 – It purchases 50% of ANP salads company.
2005 – It purchases Sabra and enters the North American market.
2006 – It launches Sabra in the United States and purchases Carousels via Sabra.
2008 – It partners with Pepsico for developing and selling dips and spreads in the American market.
2010 – It inaugurates a salads factory in Virginia, the largest salads factory in worldwide. Tari (a PepsiCo and Strauss entity) extends activities to Western Europe, Serbia, Brazil, Mexico and Australia. 
2013 – Strauss becomes one entity – Sabra-Obela.

See also
Economy of Israel

References

External links 

Food and drink companies of Israel
Israeli brands
Coffee brands
Dairy products companies of Israel
Brand name chocolate
Companies based in Petah Tikva
Companies listed on the Tel Aviv Stock Exchange
Agriculture companies of Israel
Coffee in Asia